Hypophytala hyetta is a butterfly in the family Lycaenidae. It is found in Cameroon, the Republic of the Congo, the Central African Republic, Gabon, the Democratic Republic of the Congo, Angola, Uganda and Tanzania.

Subspecies
Hypophytala hyetta hyetta (Cameroon, Congo, Gabon, Democratic Republic of the Congo, Angola)
Hypophytala hyetta latifascia Libert & Collins, 1999 (Central African Republic)

References

External links

Die Gross-Schmetterlinge der Erde 13: Die Afrikanischen Tagfalter. Plate XIII 65 d

Butterflies described in 1873
Poritiinae
Butterflies of Africa
Taxa named by William Chapman Hewitson